Dubovskoy is a Slavic masculine surname, its feminine counterpart is Dubovskaya. It may refer to
Nikolay Dubovskoy (1859–1918), Russian landscape painter
Volha Dubouskaya (born 1983), Belarusian long-distance runner

Russian-language surnames